Primrose Aerodrome  is located near Primrose, Alberta, Canada.

References

Registered aerodromes in Alberta
County of St. Paul No. 19